Kai Diekmann (born 27 June 1964 in Ravensburg) is a German journalist. From 1998 until 2000 he was editor of Welt am Sonntag (English: World on Sunday). From January 2001 to December 2015 he was chief editor of Bild. He is also a member of the executive board of the Turkish daily Hürriyet.

Life

Diekmann grew up in Bielefeld. After his Abitur (or matura) exam and mandatory military service, which he completed on the editorial staff of a military newspaper, he studied at the University of Münster. There he became a member of the Burschenschaft Franconia. He interrupted his studies in 1985 when he began his Volontariat (roughly: traineeship) at the Axel Springer AG through the Axel Springer Journalist School, from which he quickly began a career for the publisher, beginning as a correspondent in Bonn.

From 1989-1991 he was the chief reporter for the Hubert Burda Media-published illustrated Bunte, a weekly featuring articles on celebrities, gossip, and lifestyle. After a short detour at the Ullstein-Verlag-published tabloid B.Z., in 1992 he transferred to Bild, the best-selling daily newspaper in Germany known for sensationalist news stories. In 1992, he became editor of Welt am Sonntag, and in 2001 returned to Bild where he became editor. Since 2004, in addition to being editor, he is also the publisher of Bild as well as Bild am Sonntag. In March 2004, the first volume of the definitive memoirs of former Bundeskanzler Helmut Kohl was published, edited by Diekmann.

Diekmann is a member of the Atlantik-Brücke, an organization that aims to further relationships between Germany and especially the United States.

Lawsuits 
Kai Diekmann sued the Berlin daily Die Tageszeitung, after, on 8 May 2002, the paper's satire page "Die Wahrheit" (The Truth) claimed that he had sought an operation to use parts of corpses to enlarge his allegedly extremely small penis. Diekmann sued the paper for 30,000 Euro in damages for illegal violations of his privacy as well as libel and defamation of character. A Berlin court ruled that there was indeed negligence on the part of the newspaper, but denied the monetary compensation demanded by Diekmann saying that, as editor of Bild, he "consciously seeks economic advantage from the violation of others' privacy" and therefore "is less heavily burdened by the violation of his own privacy," and furthermore that he should "assume that those standards that he lays on others are also of importance for himself."
An appeal against the ruling was given no chance of success by the higher court and both sides withdrew their appeals.

Family 
From 1995 until 1997 Diekmann was married to Jonica Jahr, the daughter of Hamburg publisher John Jahr, Jr. On 28 January 2002 he married Bild columnist Katja Kessler, with former Chancellor of Germany Helmut Kohl serving as his best man. Diekmann and Kessler have four children, Yella, Caspar, Kolja and Lilly.

Publications 
 Kai Diekmann, Hat die christliche Botschaft keinen Platz mehr in den Medien? Referate und Stellungnahmen bei einer Medientagung zum 25jährigen Jubiläum der Nachrichtenagentur Idea. Wetzlar: Evangelische Nachrichtenagentur, 1995. ISSN 1614-502X
 Helmut Kohl (Kai Diekmann, Ralf G. Reuth, eds.), Ich wollte Deutschlands Einheit. Berlin: Ullstein, 2000. 
 Kai Diekmann, Der große Selbstbetrug: Wie wir um unsere Zukunft gebracht werden. 3rd ed. Munich: Piper, 2007. 
 Kai Diekmann, Süper Freunde: Was Türken und Deutsche sich wirklich zu sagen haben. Munich, Piper, 2008. 
 Kai Diekmann, Die Mauer: Fotografien 1961 - 1992. Fackelträger, 2009. 
 Kai Diekmann, Die längste Nacht, der größte Tag: Deutschland am 9. November 1989. Munich, Piper, 2009.

Awards 
 Goldene Feder 2000, 2005
 World Media Award 2002
 Blogger Newcomer of the Year, 2009
 Media Man of the Year, 2009

See also 
 Friede sei mit Dir

References

External links 

1964 births
Living people
German male journalists
German journalists
German newspaper journalists
20th-century German journalists
21st-century German journalists
German male writers
Axel Springer SE
Bild people
Welt am Sonntag editors